Ian Theodore Anderson (born May 2, 1998) is an American professional baseball pitcher for the Atlanta Braves of Major League Baseball (MLB). Anderson was selected out of high school by the Braves with the third overall pick of the 2016 MLB draft. He made his major league debut in 2020. Anderson won a World Series ring in 2021 as a member of the Atlanta Braves.

Amateur baseball
Anderson played in the 2013 14-and-under Babe Ruth League World Series in Moses Lake, Washington, with his team from Clifton Park, New York. Anderson's team finished third, and he was named to the all-defensive team as a pitcher. The squad was managed by Tom Huerter, father of teammate and future NBA player Kevin Huerter.

Anderson attended Shenendehowa High School in Clifton Park, New York. As a junior, he was 6–1 with a 0.66 earned run average (ERA) and 91 strikeouts. In August 2015, he played in Perfect Game All-American Classic at Petco Park. That same summer, he played for the 18U National Team that won the World Cup. In 2016, he helped lead Shenendehowa to a Class AA state championship. 

Anderson graduated from Shenendehowa in 2016. He committed to play college baseball at Vanderbilt.

Professional career

Minor leagues

Anderson was considered one of the top prospects in the 2016 MLB draft. To induce Anderson to forgo college baseball, the Atlanta Braves selected him with the third overall pick in the 2016 draft and signed him for $4 million.

Anderson made his professional debut with the GCL Braves and was promoted to the Danville Braves on August 6, 2016. He finished the 2016 season with a combined 1–2 record and 2.04 ERA in ten starts between both teams. In 2017, he played with the Rome Braves where he went 4–5 with a 3.14 ERA in 20 starts. He began 2018 with the Florida Fire Frogs and was promoted to the Mississippi Braves on August 8. In 24 starts between the two clubs, he was 4–7 with a 2.49 ERA. 

Anderson was invited to spring training before the 2019 season began, and returned to Mississippi to start the year. At midseason, he was selected as a Southern League All-Star, then subsequently named to the 2019 All-Star Futures Game. On August 5, Anderson was promoted to the Gwinnett Stripers, and made his International League debut the next day. At the end of the season, Anderson won the Braves' organizational pitcher of the year award.

Atlanta Braves
Anderson was invited to spring training in 2020. Following the cancellation of the 2020 Minor League Baseball season due to the COVID-19 pandemic, the Atlanta Braves placed Anderson on its initial list of up to 60 players eligible to play for the team during the shortened Major League Baseball season. On August 26, 2020, Anderson was promoted to the major leagues for the first time, and his contract was selected to the active roster. He debuted in the first game of a doubleheader against the New York Yankees, going through the first  innings without yielding a hit.  Anderson completed six innings, giving up one earned run on a home run by Luke Voit. 

Anderson finished the 2020 season with a 3–2 record over 6 games started and 32 innings, posting a 1.95 ERA with 41 strikeouts, while giving up just 21 hits. He was fifth in the NL with 4 wild pitches. He relied mostly on his 95 mph fourseam fastball, 88 mph changeup, and 80 mph curveball, and only rarely threw a 92 mph sinker. Anderson received a single vote in National League Rookie of the Year voting, tying him for seventh place with Andrés Giménez and Sixto Sánchez.

On October 1, 2020, making his first postseason appearance, Anderson earned the win against the Cincinnati Reds, clinching the Wild Card Series for the Braves.  He became the youngest pitcher in MLB postseason history to allow fewer than three hits while striking out nine while pitching at least six innings. In the NLDS game on October 7, Anderson threw 5.2 innings and got 9 strikeouts as the Braves beat the Miami Marlins 2–0.

In 2021, Anderson was 9–5 with a 3.58 ERA in 24 starts. He won a World Series ring as a member of the 2021 Atlanta Braves. Anderson became the 2nd person in World Series history to throw five no-hit innings in one game, accomplished during the 2021 World Series, in Game 3, striking out four Houston Astros batters and earning the win in the Braves' 2–0 victory.

Anderson struggled throughout the 2022 season, starting 21 games, and pitching to a 9–6 record, alongside a 5.11 ERA, until he was demoted to the Gwinnett Stripers on August 7. He issued an MLB-leading 53 walks up to that point in the season.

In 2023, after impressive spring training performances from Jared Shuster and Dylan Dodd, Anderson was optioned to Triple-A Gwinnett to begin the regular season.

Scouting report
As a prospect, Anderson's pitches included a mid-90s 4-seam and 2-seam fastball, plus curveball, and developing changeup. Anderson throws a 12–6 curveball with a low spin rate. In the minors, Anderson used his curveball more frequently against right-handed batters. By the time he reached the major leagues, Anderson's changeup had improved markedly. His arm angle has stood out to teammates, as it is higher than that of most pitchers.

Personal life
Ian Anderson's identical twin brother, Ben Anderson, also played baseball for Shenendehowa and was drafted by the Toronto Blue Jays in the 26th round of the 2016 MLB Draft. Ben opted to attend Binghamton University, where he played baseball for three seasons before being drafted by the Texas Rangers in the 13th round of the 2019 Major League Baseball draft. Anderson also has a younger brother named Isaac.

His father, Bob Anderson, played college baseball at Siena and won multiple New York State championships as a coach at Schalmont High School.

References

External links

1998 births
Living people
Atlanta Braves players
Baseball players from New York (state)
Danville Braves players
Florida Fire Frogs players
Gulf Coast Braves players
Gwinnett Stripers players
Major League Baseball pitchers
Mississippi Braves players
People from Clifton Park, New York
Rome Braves players
American identical twins
Twin sportspeople
Identical twin males